The 2004 congressional elections in Indiana were elections for Indiana's delegation to the United States House of Representatives, which occurred along with congressional elections nationwide on November 2, 2004. Republicans held a majority of Indiana's delegation, 6-3, before the elections. The only incumbent to lose re-election was Democrat Baron Hill, losing to Republican Mike Sodrel in the 9th district.

Results
The following are the final results from the Secretary of State of Indiana.

Overview

District 1

This district includes a small strip of northwest Indiana. The district has been one of the most Democratic in Indiana.

District 2

This district is centered on South Bend, Indiana and the Indiana portion of the Michiana region.

District 3

This district is located in the northeast corner of Indiana and has a large population center in Fort Wayne.

District 4

This district is located in west-central Indiana. Located within the district is the city of West Lafayette and many suburban towns.

District 5

This district located mostly north of Indianapolis, including the largest suburbs of Indianapolis in Hamilton County.

District 6

This district takes in a large portion of eastern Indiana, including the cities of Muncie, Anderson, and Richmond.

District 7

This district is in the heart of Central Indiana and encompasses most of Marion County/Indianapolis.

District 8

Population centers of Evansville and Terre Haute are located within its limits along with numerous other small towns.

District 9

This district is located in southeast Indiana. The largest city located within the district is Bloomington followed by; Columbus, New Albany, Jeffersonville, and Clarksville.

See also
United States House of Representatives elections, 2004
United States Senate election in Indiana, 2004
United States presidential election in Indiana, 2004

References

2004
Indiana
2004 Indiana elections